ο Pegasi, Latinized as Omicron Pegasi, is a suspected astrometric binary star system in the northern constellation of Pegasus. It is white in hue and visible to the naked eye as a faint point of light with an apparent visual magnitude of +4.80. The distance to this system is approximately 290 light years based on parallax, and it is drifting further away from the Sun with a radial velocity of +8.5 km/s.

The visible component has a stellar classification of A1 IV, matching a subgiant star that has begun to cool, expand and brighten off the main sequence. It has very narrow lines due to a low projected rotational velocity of 6 km/s. The abundances of iron are Sun-like, while it displays an overabundance of heavier elements. Some studies have suggested it is an Am-like star. Omicron Pegasi is an estimated 184 million years old with 2.24 times the mass of the Sun. It is radiating 104 times the Sun's luminosity from its photosphere at an effective temperature of 9,956 K.

References

A-type subgiants
Am stars
Astrometric binaries

Pegasus (constellation)
Pegasi, Omicron
Durchmusterung objects
Pegasi, 43
214994
112051
8641